Vali Israfilov (born 18 October 2002) is an Azerbaijani paralympic-swimmer. At the 2020 Summer Paralympics he won a gold in the 100 metre breaststroke SB12 event.

Personal life
He is studying at Azerbaijan State Oil and Industry University.

References

Living people
2002 births
Azerbaijani male swimmers
Medalists at the World Para Swimming Championships
Medalists at the 2020 Summer Paralympics
Swimmers at the 2020 Summer Paralympics
Paralympic medalists in swimming
Paralympic gold medalists for Azerbaijan
Paralympic swimmers of Azerbaijan
People from Tyumen
Male breaststroke swimmers
S12-classified Paralympic swimmers
21st-century Azerbaijani people